This list is about IFK Norrköping players with at least 100 league appearances. For a list of all IFK Norrköping players with a Wikipedia article, see :Category:IFK Norrköping players. For the current IFK Norrköping first-team squad, see First-team squad.

This is a list of IFK Norrköping players with at least 100 league appearances.

Players
Matches of current players as of 8 April 2015.

References

 
Players
IFK Norrkoping

 Association football player non-biographical articles